Vezhbolovo is a rural locality (or village) in Kurilovskoye Rural Settlement, Sobinsky District, Vladimir Oblast, Russia. The population was 5 as of 2010.

Geography 
Vezhbolovo is located on the Vezhbolovka River, 23 km north of Sobinka (the district's administrative centre) by road. Bogatishchevo is the nearest rural locality.

References 

Rural localities in Sobinsky District